The Visitor, directed by Mehmet Eryilmaz, is 2015 Turkish film. The Visitor is the second feature film of Mehmet Eryilmaz has produced “A Fairground Attraction” as well as some other dramatic documentaries. The Visitor analyses the universal mother-daughter issue, with death theme and covers the sexual harassment within the family  as the sub story. With the hope which drives from tragedy, this film tells the story of misfits as the first film of the director.

The leading actors are Zümrüt Erkin, Tamer Levent, Ayten Uncuoğlu, Hale Akınlı, Ersin Umut Güler and young actress Melek Çınar. Sema Moritz with her songs and Fatih Al from the previous film, now Nur’s lover, acting fairground guy Cemal again is acting ‘Cemal’ in the Visitor.

Plot 
Ten years after being thrown out of her parental home, Nur hears that her mother is at death’s door. Taking her young daughter with her, Nur hurries back to her father’s world to see, and reconcile with her mother before it is too late. While the universal theme of mother-daughter relationships lies at the centre of the film, this is underpinned by an allusive subtext of incest, one of the most common but least addressed social problems in Turkey. The individual stories of the family members combine with a sense of hope fuelled by tragedy to paint a portrait of the socially disconnected.

Cast 
 Zümrüt Erkin
 Tamer Levent
 Ayten Uncuoğlu
 Hale Akınlı
 Ersin Umut Güler
 Melek Çınar
 Fatih Al
 Sema Moritz
 Ümit Çırak
 Figen Yalçınkaya
 Mesut Coşkun
 Aziz Albeniz
 Emre Çağrı Akbaba

Production 

Atlanta Film

Reception
Review from The Hollywood Reporter.

Awards 

 2015 International Montreal World Film Festival FIPRESCI Award - WON
 2015 International Montreal World Film Festival Grand Jury Prize - WON
 2015 International  Haifa Film Festival Main Competition - NOMINATED

References

External links 
 misafirfilm.com

2015 films